The 1917 SAPFL Grand Final was an Australian rules football game contested between the Port Adelaide Football Club and the West Torrens Football Club, held at Alberton Oval on Saturday 1 September 1917. It was the 2nd Grand Final of the South Australian Patriotic Football League, staged to determine the premiers of the 1917 SAPFL season. The match was won by Port Adelaide by a margin of 16 points, marking that clubs second patriotic premiership victory.

The SAFL was opposed to the formation of the Patriotic League and refused to recognise it during and after World War I.

Teams 
West Torrens made two late changes with Campbell and Marsh.

References 

SAPFL Grand Final, 1917